was a photographer and poet.
He was a prominent Japanese surrealist born in Nagoya, Japan.

Biography

Birth
He was born in Naka-ku, Nagoya, Aichi, Japan. He was the oldest son of Goro Yamamoto (1880–1941), who was the founding member of Aiyu Photography Club. Goro was running a photo studio and a shop selling cameras in Nagoya.

Encounter with Surrealism

He encountered surrealism and dadaism through the poetry magazine "cine´" published by Yamanaka Chiruu who was promoting surrealism in Japan. At the age of 15, he started to write poems. He graduated from　the Nagoya Second Commercial School in 1929. That year, he started writing poetry. He left Meiji University School of Arts and letters in Tokyo, where he majored in French Literature before graduation and then went back to Nagoya. In 1931, at the age of 17, he published his works in the Journal "Dokuritsu(Independent)", which was published by "Dokuritsu Shashin Kenkyu Kai(Independent Photography Research Association)".

Kansuke Yamamoto as a Surrealist

The oldest of his existing works is called "Aru Ningen no Shisou no Hatten・・・Moya to Shinshitsu(The Developing Thought of a Human...Mist and Bedroom)", which was published in a magazine in 1932.
In 1936, he changed his Chinese characters from 勘助(Kansuke) to 悍右(Kansuke). In 1938, he started a surrealist poetry magazine called "Yoru no Funsui(The Night's Fountain)". But the next year, the publication was forced to be discontinued by the authoritative pressure due to　the Peace Preservation Law.

In 1939, he formed a group called "Nagoya Photo Avant-Garde" with Tajima Tsugio, Minoru Sakata, Shimozato Yoshio, and Yamanaka Chiruu, etc. The group applied surrealism into their photographs and their avant-garde photography gathered national attention by some magazines like "Photo Times" and "Camera Art". He became a member of "VOU" in 1939, belonging until it was dissolved in 1972. He also formed "VIVI" (1948–1950), "Bijyutsu Bunka Association, Division of Photography" (1949–1954), "Mado(Windows)"(1953–1958), "Honoo (Flame)" (1955–1961), "Subjective Photography Federation of Japan" (1956), "ESPACE" (1956–1958), "Arukishine" (1958), "Avant-Garde Association of Poets" (1958) and "Nagoya Five" (1963–1964).

He often created works which indicated liberty, antiwar and anti-government in surrealistic ways.

Later life
From around 1965 to 1975, he coached the younger generation as an adviser of Chubu Photography Federation of Students.

He also donated his body to science via Nagoya University School of Medicine upon his death and no funeral was held, in accordance with his living will.

Works
 Nagoya City Art Museum 
 Tokyo Metropolitan Museum of Photography 
 Santa Barbara Museum of Art 
 The J. Paul Getty Museum(J. Paul Getty Trust)
 The Art Institute of Chicago
Smithsonian's Freer | Sackler, Washington DC

Exhibitions

1936 Personal Exhibition / Maruzen Gallery, Nagoya, Japan
1939 "The Blue Wonder Association Exhibition" / Maruzen Gallery, Nagoya, Japan
1948 – 1950 "VIVI" / Maruzen Gallery, Nagoya, Japan
1949 "Modern Art" / Mitsukoshi Gallery, Nihonbashi, Japan
1949 – 1954 "Bijyutsu Bunka Art Association Exhibition" / Tokyo Metropolitan Art Museum etc.
1952　"Photographers of Figurative art" / Aoyanagi-Hirokoji-Ten, Nagoya, Japan
1953 "Mado(Windows)" / Nagoya, Kobe, Japan
1953 "Abstraction and Fantasy: How to Understand Non-figurative (Non-realistic) Painting" / National Museum of Modern Art, Tokyo
1956 – 1961 "Honoo(Flame)" / Konica Gallery(Konica Minolta Plaza), Tokyo, Osaka, and Nagoya, Japan
1956 "International Subjective Photography" / Takashimaya Gallery, Nihonbashi, Japan
1956 Personal Exhibition / Matsushima Gallery, Ginza, Japan
1956 Personal Exhibition / Maruzen Gallery, Nagoya, Japan
1957 Personal Exhibition / Konica Gallery(Konica Minolta Plaza), Fukuoka, Japan
1957 – 1976 "VOU Exhibition" / Kunugi Gallery, Ginza, Tokyo, Japan etc.
1957 "Modern Art Photography Group" / Kunugi Gallery, Ginza, Tokyo, Japan
1958 "ESPACE" / Maruzen Gallery, Nagoya, Japan
1958 "Exhibition of Japan Subjective Photography" / Fuji Photo Salon(FUJIFILM Photo Salon), Tokyo, Japan
1958 "The Vanguard of Photography and Poetry" / Mimatsu Publishing, Inc. Gallery, Tokyo, Japan
1960 "The Sense of Abstraction" / The Museum of Modern Art (MoMA), New York CityA.
1960 "Subjective Photography" / Konica Gallery(Konica Minolta Plaza), Tokyo, Japan
1963　"Shusen Kai"
1963 – 1964 "Nagoya Five" / Fuji Photo Salon(FUJIFILM Photo Salon), Tokyo, etc.
1968 "VERB" / Aichi Prefectural Museum of Art, Japan
1978 – 1982 "The Exhibition of The Committee of The Chubu Headquarter of The All-Japan Association of Photographic Societies" / Aichi Prefectural Museum of Art, Japan
1983 "Pictures of Yamamoto Kansuke" / New French School, Nagoya, Japan
1986 "Avant-Garde Photography, Italy and Japan / The Contemporary Art Gallery, Seibu Department Stores, Ikebukuro, Tokyo, Japan
1986 "VOU" / Rhode Island School of Design Museum
1988 "The Art of Modern Japanese Photography" / Two Houston Center
1988 "Surrealist Kansuke Yamamoto Exhibition" / IMAGINATION MARKET Q&P, Ginza, Tokyo, Japan
1988 "The 150 years of Fine Art Photography – France, Japan, America" / Tsukashin Hall, Amagasaki, Hyogo, Japan
1988 "Fine Art Photography in Japan 1920's – 1940's" / Konica Plaza(Konica Minolta Plaza), Shinjuku, Tokyo, Japan
1988 "Japanese Photography in 1930s" / The Museum of Modern Art, Kamakura & Hayama, Japan

1989 "Avant-Garde Photography of Nagoya" / Nagoya City Art Museum, Japan
1990 "The Silent Dialogue: Still Life in the West and Japan" / Shizuoka Prefectural Museum of Art, Japan
1990 "Surrealism in Japan" / Nagoya City Art Museum, Japan
1990 "Modernism in Nagoya 1920's – 1930's" / INAX　Gallery, Nagoya, Japan
1995 "The Founding and Development of Modern Photography in Japan" / Tokyo Metropolitan Museum of Photography, Japan
1995 "The Age of Modernism" / Tokyo Metropolitan Museum of Photography, Japan
1995 "Collage, A Method of Contemporary Art" / Nerima Art Museum, Japan
2001 "Modern Photography in Japan 1915–1940" / Ansel Adams Gallery, San Francisco, U.S.A.
2001 "Yamamoto Kansuke: Conveyor of the Impossible" / Tokyo Station Gallery, Japan

2003 "The History of Japanese Photography" / The Museum of Fine Arts, Houston etc.
2004 "Provincial Fine Arts" / Nagoya　City Art Museum, Aichi, Japan
2005 "How Photography changed People's Viewpoints" / Tokyo Metropolitan Museum of Photography, Japan
2006" Kansuke Yamamoto" / Stephen Wirtz Gallery、San Francisco, U.S.A.
2006 "Curators' Choice from The Collection of Tokyo Metropolitan Museum of Photography" / Tokyo Metropolitan Museum of Photography, Japan
2006 "Collage and Photomontage" / Tokyo Metropolitan Museum of Photography, Japan
2006 "The World of Yamamoto Kansuke" / Doshisha University, Tokyo office　
2007 "The New Modern: Pre- and Post-War Japanese Photography" / Santa Barbara Museum of Art, Santa Barbara, U.S.A.
2007 "Master the Museum's Collection" / Nagoya City Art Museum, Japan
2007 "Living in the Material World -'Things' in Art of the 20th Century and Beyond" / The National Art Center, Tokyo, Japan
2008 "Surrealism and Photography" / Tokyo Metropolitan Museum of Photography, Japan
2009 "20 Years of Nagoya City Art Museum" / Nagoya City Art Museum, Japan
2010 "World of Surrealism by the Collection" / Nagoya City Art Museum, Japan
2012 "Drawing Surrealism" / Los Angeles County Museum of Art (LACMA), Los Angeles, U.S.A.
2012 "Japan ・ Object 1920's – 70's" / Urawa Art Museum, Saitama, Japan

2013 "Drawing Surrealism" / The Morgan Library & Museum, New York CityA.
2013 "Japan's Modern Divide: The Photographs of Hiroshi Hamaya and Kansuke Yamamoto" / The J. Paul Getty Museum, Los Angeles, U.S.A.
2014 "Enjoy the Art World −with your loved one" / Nagoya City Art Museum, Japan
2015 "1940s -Rediscovery of 20th Century Japanese Art" / Mie Prefectural Art Museum, Japan
2015 Paris Photo 2015 / Grand Palais, Paris, France

2016 Art Central Hong Kong, Hong Kong
2016 "Kansuke Yamamoto" / Taka Ishii Gallery New York, New York City
2016 Art Basel (Taka Ishii Gallery), Basel, Switzerland
2016 Frieze London, Frieze Art Fair (Taka Ishii Gallery), London, England
2016 Paris Photo 2016(Taka Ishii Gallery) / Grand Palais, Paris, France
2016 " BLACK SUN/RED MOON" / RATIO 3, San Francisco, U.S.A.
2016 "Japanese Photography from Postwar to Now" / San Francisco Museum of Modern Art (SFMoMA), San Francisco, U.S.A.
2017 "Kansuke Yamamoto" / Taka Ishii Gallery Photography / Film, Roppongi, Tokyo
2017 Group Exhibition "Japanese Surrealist Photography" / Taka Ishii Gallery Tokyo, Roppongi, Tokyo
2017 Art Basel Hong Kong (Taka Ishii Gallery) / Hong Kong
2017 "Kansuke Yamamoto" / Taka Ishii Gallery New York, New York City
2017 SP-Arte (Taka Ishii Gallery) / Fundação Bienal de São Paulo, São Paulo, Brazil
2017 Art Basel (Taka Ishii Gallery) /  Basel, Switzerland
2017 Frieze London, Frieze Art Fair (Taka Ishii Gallery), London, England
2017 Paris Photo 2017(Taka Ishii Gallery) / Grand Palais, Paris, France
2018 "THE MAGAZINE and THE NEW PHOTOGRAPHY: KOGA and JAPANESE MODERNISM." / Tokyo Photographic Art Museum
2018 "SHAPE OF LIGHT 100 YEARS OF PHOTOGRAPHY AND ABSTRACT ART" / Tate Modern, Tate Britain, London, England
2018 "Kansuke Yamamoto" / Taka Ishii Gallery New York, New York City
2018 "Kansuke Yamamoto" / Nonaka-Hill, Los Angeles

2019 Homage to the Bauhaus / Djanogly Gallery, Nottingham Lakeside Arts Centre, Nottingham, England, UK
2019 "Aichi Art Chronicle 1919-2019" /Aichi Prefectural Museum of Art, Aichi
2019 "Japanese Photography – 1930s - 1970s" / Mai 36 Galerie, Zurich
2021 "The Movement Of Modern Photography In Nagoya 1911-1972" / Nagoya City Art Museum, Japan
2021 "From the museum collection 2021: second period" / Aichi Prefectural Museum of Art
2021 “Surrealism Beyond Borders” / Metropolitan Museum of Art, New York
2022 "Going Global: Abstract Art at Mid-Century" / Santa Barbara Museum of Art, Santa Barbara, California, United States.

Solo exhibition catalogues
"YAMAMOTO Kansuke : Conveyor of the Impossible", John Solt and Kaneko Ryuichi, East Japan Railway Culture Foundation, 2001
"YAMAMOTO KANSUKE" STEPHEN WIRTZ GALLERY SAN FRANCISCO 2006
Japan's Modern Divide: The Photographs of Hiroshi Hamaya and Kansuke Yamamoto (2013); Edited by Judith Keller & Amanda Maddox, with contributions by Kotaro Iizawa, Ryuichi Kaneko, Jonathan Reynolds; published by The J. Paul Getty Museum
"Kansuke Yamamoto", Ryuichi Kaneko, Taka Ishii Gallery, 2017

Books by Kansuke Yamamoto

Kansuke Yamamoto, "Yoruno Funsui", 1938–
Kansuke Yamamoto, "Batafurai (Butterfly)", Nagoya Miniature Books Publishing, 1970
『Kansuke Yamamoto』　Photographs and texts. Published by : Fine-Art Photography Association Tokyo 2017

Selected works
The Developing Thought of a Human... Mist and Bedroom, 1932, Kansuke Yamamoto, collage, and gelatin silver print. Collection of Nagoya City Art Museum.
Title unknown, 1933, Kansuke Yamamoto, Gelatin silver print, 25.2 × 30.0 cm. Private collection.
Title unknown, 1938, Kansuke Yamamoto, Gelatin silver print, 18.7 × 24.5 cm. Collection of Gloria Katz and Willard Huyck.
Title unknown, 1938, Kansuke Yamamoto, Gelatin silver print, 15.9 × 24.6 cm. Collection of Nagoya City Art Museum.
Title unknown, 1939, Kansuke Yamamoto, Gelatin silver print, 24.4 × 29.6 cm.
Untitled, ca. 1930s, Kansuke Yamamoto, Gelatin silver print, 43.8 × 36.2 cm. Collection of Daniel Greenberg and Susan Steinhauser.
Buddhist Temple's Birdcage, 1940, Kansuke Yamamoto, Gelatin silver print, 25.7 × 17.9 cm. Collection of The Art Institute of Chicago.
Variation of "Buddhist Temple's Birdcage", 1940, Kansuke Yamamoto, Gelatin silver print, 30.2 × 24.8 cm. Collection of Nagoya City Art Museum.
Self-Portrait, 1940, Kansuke Yamamoto, Gelatin silver print, 46. × 56.4 cm. Private collection.
Title unknown, ca. 1940s, Kansuke Yamamoto, Gelatin silver print, 25.2 × 17.7 cm.
View with a Ship Passing Through, 1941, Kansuke Yamamoto, Collage, 24.5 × 30.3 cm. Private collection.
Stapled Flesh, 1949, Kansuke Yamamoto, gelatin silver print, 31.1 × 24.8 cm. Collection of Santa Barbara Museum of Art.
A Chronicle of Drifting, 1949, Kansuke Yamamoto, Collage, 30 × 24.8 cm. Collection of The J.P.Getty Museum.

Self-Portrait, 1949, Kansuke Yamamoto, Gelatin silver print, 25.2 × 17.9 cm. Private collection.
Scenery with Ocean, 1949, Kansuke Yamamoto, Gelatin silver print, 27.0 × 18.4 cm.
Dream Passage, 1949, Kansuke Yamamoto, Gelatin silver print, 30.0 × 24.9 cm.
Floating City, 1950, Kansuke Yamamoto, Gollage, 15.7 × 22.4 cm. Private collection.
Isamu Noguchi, 1950, Kansuke Yamamoto, Gelatin silver print, 23.4 × 18.2 cm.
Gorgeous Departure, 1950, Kansuke Yamamoto, 27.8 × 22.7 cm.
Reminiscence, 1953, Kansuke Yamamoto, gelatin silver print. Collection of Anne and David Ruderman.
Relaxation Season, 1953, Kansuke Yamamoto, Gelatin silver print, 27.5 × 22.9 cm. Private collection.
Sleepy Sea, 1953, Kansuke Yamamoto, Gelatin silver print, 27.6 × 31.0 cm.
Giving Birth to a Joke, 1956, Kansuke Yamamoto, Gelatin silver print, 42.5 × 55.6 cm. Private collection.
Rose and Shovel, 1956, Kansuke Yamamoto, Gelatin silver print, 31.9 × 34.9 cm. Private collection.
The Distance between the Landscape and the Dusk, 1956, Kansuke Yamamoto, Chromogenic print, 31.9 × 34.9 cm.
Beautiful Passerby 1956,Kansuke Yamamoto, Chromogenic print
My Thin-Aired Room, 1956, Kansuke Yamamoto, Gelatin silver print, 34.9 × 42.9 cm.
My Thin-Aired Room, 1956, Kansuke Yamamoto, Gelatin silver print, 35.2 × 42.2 cm. 
My Thin-Aired Room, 1956, Kansuke Yamamoto, Gelatin silver print, 35.4 × 43 cm. 
My Thin-Aired Room, 1956, Kansuke Yamamoto, Gelatin silver print, 35.2 × 42.9 cm.
The Man Who Went Too Far, 1956, Kansuke Yamamoto, Gelatin silver print.
Cold Person, 1956, Kansuke Yamamoto, Gelatin silver print, 43.8 × 36.2 cm. Collection of Gloria Katz and Willard Huyck.
From the series of "Obaku", 1956, Kansuke Yamamoto.
The Origin of History, 1956, Kansuke Yamamoto, Chromogenic print, 52.5 × 47.8 cm.Collection of J. Paul Getty Museum.
The Closed Room, 1958, Kansuke Yamamoto, Gelatin silver print, 35.9 × 45.0 cm.
A Forgotten Person, 1958, Kansuke Yamamoto, Chromogenic Print, 46.2 × 33.0 cm. Collection of J. Paul Getty Museum.
(The hard, cobalt desert...), 1958, Kansuke Yamamoto.
My Bench, 1963, Kansuke Yamamoto.
I’d Like to Think While in the Body of a Horse, 1964, Kansuke Yamamoto, Chromogenic Print, 46.2 × 33.0 cm. Collection of J. Paul Getty Museum.
Suddenly in the Morning, 1958, Kansuke Yamamoto.
Magnifying Glass, Rendezvous, 1970, Kansuke Yamamoto.
Butterfly, 1970, Kansuke Yamamoto. 
The silver platter and the pigeon in the cage, / We suddenly have spring rain like typefaces today. / Cioran, / I may talk to you again someday, 1979, Kansuke Yamamoto.
Under rose flowers of exploding black gunpowder / Girl flutters her braided hair running to the plaza / Dawn laughs out loud swaying its shoulders, 1983, Kansuke Yamamoto.

Bibliography

Exhibition catalogues
"The Founding and Development of Modern Photography in Japan", Tokyo Metropolitan Museum of Photography, 1995
"Surrealism in Japan", Nagoya City Art Museum, 1990
"Avant-Garde Photography of Nagoya", Nagoya City Art Museum, 1989
"Yamamoto Kansuke: Conveyor of the Impossible", John Solt and Kaneko Ryuichi, East Japan Railway Culture Foundation, 2001
"The History of Japanese Photography", Anne Wilkes Tucker, Dana Frs-Hansen II, Dana Friis-Hansen, Kaneko Ryuichi, Takeba Joe, Kotaro Iizawa, Kinoshita Naoyuki, Yale University Press, 2003
"Drawing Surrealism", Leslie Jones, Isabelle Dervaux, Susan Laxton, Prestel Pub, 2012
Japan's Modern Divide: The Photographs of Hiroshi Hamaya and Kansuke Yamamoto (2013); Edited by Judith Keller & Amanda Maddox, with contributions by Kotaro Iizawa, Ryuichi Kaneko, Jonathan Reynolds; published by The J. Paul Getty Museum
"Kansuke Yamamoto", Ryuichi Kaneko, Taka Ishii Gallery, 2017

Books
Nagoya City Art Museum, Supervised by Hiroshi Kamiya and Minako Tsunoda, Edited by Kazuo Yamawaki, Toshihide Yoshida, Katsunori Fukaya, Satoshi Yamada, Joe Takeba, Minako Tsunoda, Akiko Harasawa and Yuko Ito, "Selected Works from the Collection of Nagoya City Art Museum", Nagoya City Art Museum, 1998
Shigeichi Nagano, Kōtarō Iizawa, and Naoyuki Kinoshita, "Japanese Photographers Vol.15 Kiyoshi Koishi And Avant-garde Photographs", Iwanami Shoten, Publishers, 1999
John Solt, Shredding the Tapestry of Meaning: The Poetry and Poetics of Kitasono Katue (1901–1978), Harvard University Press, 1999
Tokyo Metropolitan Museum of Photography, "328 Outstanding Japanese Photographers", Tankosha, 2000
John Solt（Translator: Tetsuya Taguchi）Edited by: Shūji Takashina, Takayuki Kojima, Ryōsuke Ōhashi, Yūko Tanaka, Noriko Hashimoto, 'On Kansuke Yamamoto', "The Aesthetics of Japan", Vol.35, Toei-sha，2002
Kazumiki Chiba, ‘YAMAMOTO Kansuke : Conveyor of the Impossible’,"Exhibition Catalogues in the Age of Cross – Cultural and Cross-Genre Studies", Edited by Eiko Imahashi, 2003
Kotaro Iizawa, "From Eyes to Eyes, Walking Through Photo Exhibitions, 2001–2003", Misuzu Shobo, 2004
Tetsuya Taguchi, "World of Kansuke Yamamoto, A World-class Photographer", Doshisha, 2005
Satomi Fujimura, "An Introduction to the History of Photography, Section Two: CREATION, The Opening of Modern Age”, Shinchosha, 2005
Teruo Ishihara, "RAVINE – Poem & Prose Little Anthology", Silver Paper Pub. Kyoto, 2011
Kotaro Iizawa, Nobuo Ina, John Szarkowski and Etsuro Ishihara, "The Tales of Syashin (the first volume)：Words by Japanese Photographers 1889–1989", aurastudio, 2012
Kotaro Iizawa, "Deep Insight! 100 Super Masterpieces of Japanese Photographs", Pie Books, 2012
Majella Munro, "Communicating Vessels: The Surrealist Movement in Japan 1925–70”, Enzo Arts and Publishing Limited, 2012
Nobuzo Kinoshita, "The Lives of Prodigy of Tokai", Edited by Shoko Komatsu, Fubaisha, 2013
Melusine n.36, Editions L'Age d'Homme, 2016 Paris.
PARIS PHOTO BY KARL LAGERFELD. Production and printing: Steidl, 2017

Articles
Taylor Mignon, "A ‘subversive’ finally brought in from the cold", The Japan Times, 15 August 2001
John Solt, "Perception, Misperception, Nonperception", Milk Magazine, 2005
REAR, 'Rediscovery:The History of Photograph of Nagoya', Rear, Vol.14, 2006
Alissa J. Anderson, "Before and After the Bomb", Santa Barbara Independent, 1 February 2007
Suzanne Muchnic, "At the Getty, a focus on Asian photographs", Los Angeles Times, 15 April 2009
Roberta Smith, "Squiggles From the Id or Straight From the Brain", The New York Times, 24 January 2013
Ánxel Grove, "Exhiben a Hamaya y Yamamoto, dos deslumbrantes fotógrafos japoneses de principios del XX", 20 minutos, 2013
Claire O'neill, "Japanese Photography: A Tale Of Two Artists", National Public Radio, 12 March 2013
Marc Haefele, "PHOTOS: Realism meets Surrealism in Getty Japanese photography exhibit", Southern California Public Radio, 27 March 2013
Richard B. Woodward, "The Realist and the Surrealist", The Wall Street Journal, 3 April 2013
Meher McArthur, “Japan’s Photographer Reflect the Realities of a Changing World”, Southern California Cultural Journal, KCET, 18 April 2013
Lauren Russell, "A surreal take on 20th-century Japan", CNN Photos – CNN.com blogs, 6 May 2013
Danielle Sommer, “From Los Angeles: Japan’s Modern Divide”, Art Practical, 6 May 2013
Bondo Wyszpolski, “Japan’s Modern Divide: the Photographs of Hiroshi Hamaya and Kansuke Yamamoto”, Easy Reader, 12 May 2013
Catherine Wagley, “Japan’s Modern Divide: the Photographs of Hiroshi Hamaya and Kansuke Yamamoto”, photograph, 28 May 2013
Smith, Douglas F., “Japan's Modern Divide: The Photographs of Hiroshi Hamaya and Kansuke Yamamoto”, Library Journal;15 June 2013, Vol. 138 Issue 11, p88, 2013
Leah Ollman, “2 Japanese photographers, 2 cultural camps at Getty Museum”, Los Angeles Times, 22 June 2013
Colin Pantall, “Japan’s Modern Divide: the Photographs of Hiroshi Hamaya and Kansuke Yamamoto”, photo-eye Blog, 18 July 2013
Akiko Horiyama, “Salad Bowl: Surreal Japan”, Mainichi Shimbun, 19 August 2013
Eiko Aoki, "The Pacific Rim Divide of “Japan’s Modern Divide”, Trans-Asia Photography Review, Hampshire College, Volume 4, Issue 1: Archives, Fall 2013
Eiko Aoki, “Behind the Folding Screen of “Japan’s Modern Divide” An interview with the curators of the Getty Museum’s Hiroshi Hamaya and Kansuke Yamamoto Photo Exhibit”, Kyoto Journal, vol.79, 23 February 2014
Montse Álvarez, “Con Kansuke Yamamoto en la penumbra de lo real”, ABC Color, 11 May 2014

Videos
SoCal Japan News Digest, 6 April 2013, UTB Hollywood

See also
History of photography/Japanese photographers
List of Japanese photographers

References

Sources
Japan's Modern Divide: The Photographs of Hiroshi Hamaya and Kansuke Yamamoto (2013); Edited by Judith Keller & Amanda Maddox, with contributions by Kotaro Iizawa, Ryuichi Kaneko, Jonathan Reynolds; published by The J. Paul Getty Museum

External links
 
 
Kansuke Yamamoto – CNN
YAMAMOTO Kansuke Image Gallery
Tokyo Station Gallery "Yamamoto Kansuke: Conveyor of the Impossible" (2001)
Yahoo!Japan Encyclopedia – 山本悍右（YAMAMOTO Kansuke）; Source: Encyclopedia Nipponica; Published by Shogakukan
John Solt, "Perception, Misperception, Nonperception", Milk Magazine, 2005

Japanese photographers
Japanese surrealist artists
1914 births
1987 deaths
People from Nagoya
20th-century Japanese poets